Vladimir Georgievich Turaev (Владимир Георгиевич Тураев, born in 1954) is a Russian mathematician, specializing in topology.

Turaev received in 1979 from the Steklov Institute of Mathematics his Candidate of Sciences degree (PhD) under Oleg Viro. Turaev was a professor at the University of Strasbourg and then became a professor at  Indiana University. In 2016 he was elected a Fellow of the American Mathematical Society.

Turaev's research deals with low-dimensional topology, quantum topology, and knot theory and their interconnections with quantum field theory. In 1991 Reshetikhin and Turaev published a mathematical construction of new topological invariants of compact oriented 3-manifolds and framed links in these manifolds, corresponding to a mathematical implementation of ideas in quantum field theory published by Witten; the invariants are now called Witten-Reshetikhin-Turaev (or Reshetikhin-Turaev) invariants. In 1992 Turaev and Viro introduced a new family of invariants for 3-manifolds by using state sums computed on triangulations of manifolds; these invariants are now called Turaev-Viro invariants.

In 1990 Turaev was an Invited Speaker with talk State sum models in low dimensional topology at the ICM in Kyōto. In 2016 he shared, with Alexis Virelizier, the Ferran Sunyer i Balaguer Prize for their monograph Monoidal categories and topological field theory.

Selected publications

Articles

with Nicolai Reshetikhin:

Books
Quantum invariants of Knots and 3-Manifolds, de Gruyter 1994; ; 
with Christian Kassel and Marc Rosso: Quantum groups and knot invariants, SMF (Panoramas et Synthèses) 1997
as editor with Anatoly Vershik: Topology, ergodic theory, real algebraic geometry - Rokhlin´s memorial, American Mathematical Society 2001
Introduction to combinatorial torsions, Birkhäuser 2001
Torsions of 3-dimensional manifolds, Birkhäuser 2002
with Christian Kassel: Braid Groups, Springer 2008, 
Homotopy quantum field theory, European Mathematical Society 2010
with Alexis Virelizier: Monoidal Categories and Topological Field Theory, Birkhäuser 2015

See also 
Reshetikhin–Turaev invariant

References

External links
Vladimir Touraev, Mathematics Department, Indiana University
mathnet.ru

20th-century Russian mathematicians
21st-century Russian mathematicians
Fellows of the American Mathematical Society
Academic staff of the University of Strasbourg
Indiana University faculty
1954 births
Living people